Mr. Mercedes is a novel by American writer Stephen King. He calls it his first hard-boiled detective book. It was published on June 3, 2014. It is the first volume in a trilogy, followed in 2015 by Finders Keepers, the first draft of which was finished around the time Mr. Mercedes was published, and End of Watch in 2016.

The novel won the 2015 Edgar Award for Best Novel from the Mystery Writers of America and Goodreads Choice Awards for 2014 in the "Mystery and Thriller" category.

Background information 
During his Chancellor's Speaker Series talk at University of Massachusetts Lowell on December 7, 2012, King indicated that he was writing a crime novel about a retired policeman being taunted by a murderer. With a working title Mr. Mercedes and inspired by a true event about a woman driving her car into a McDonald's restaurant, it was originally meant to be a short story just a few pages long. Describing the novel for an interview with USA Today, published on September 18, 2013, King said that while it was started prior to the Boston Marathon bombings, Mr. Mercedes involves a terrorist plot which is "too creepily close for comfort". An excerpt was published in the May 16, 2014 issue of Entertainment Weekly.

Plot
Many jobless people are standing in line for a job fair, but then a Mercedes S class plows into the crowd, killing eight  and severely injuring many. Bill Hodges, a recently retired detective from the local police department living the life of a retiree, receives a letter from an individual claiming to be the person responsible for the job fair incident, referring to himself as "Mr. Mercedes". Hodges is divorced, lonely, and fed up with his life, occasionally considering suicide. The incident had taken place at the end of Hodges' career and was still unresolved when he retired. Mr. Mercedes knows details of the murder and also mentions Olivia Trelawney, from whom he had stolen the Mercedes. Olivia had killed herself soon after the massacre out of guilt. Hodges is intrigued and starts to investigate the case instead of turning the letter over to his former police colleague, Pete Huntley.

Brady Hartsfield, who is revealed to be Mr. Mercedes, is an emotionally disturbed psychopath in his late twenties who lost his father at age eight. When he was a young boy, he killed his mentally handicapped brother at his mother's prompting. He lives with his alcoholic mother and has an incestuous relationship with her, and he works in an electronics store and sells ice-cream from an ice-cream truck. Riding in the truck enables him to observe Hodges and Hodges' neighbors, among them seventeen-year-old Jerome Robinson, who does small chores for Hodges.

During his research about the wealthy Olivia Trelawney, Hodges meets her sister Janey, who hires him to investigate Olivia's suicide and the theft of the Mercedes. Shortly after Hodges begins to work for Janey, the two begin dating. Hodges finds out, with the help of bright, computer savvy Jerome, how Mr. Mercedes stole the car and then drove Olivia (whom he made contact with through his job at the electronics shop) to suicide by leaving eerie sound files on her computer that were set to go off at unpredictable intervals, which escalated her feelings of guilt. Olivia, when hearing these sounds, believed them to be the ghosts of the victims of the Mercedes Massacre. At the funeral of Janey and Olivia's recently deceased mother, Hodges meets Janey's unpleasant relatives, among them Janey's emotionally unstable cousin Holly. After the funeral, Mr. Mercedes watches as Janey goes to bring Hodges' car to the church steps. As the car approaches Holly and Hodges, he blows up the car with Janey in it using his remote device to call to a mobile phone on the car seat. Janey is killed in the explosion. Hodges feels remorse, but becomes even more eager to solve the case without the help of the police. Holly joins Hodges and Jerome in the investigation.

Hartsfield accidentally kills his mother with a poisoned hamburger, which he had prepared for Jerome's dog. With her rotting body in their house, he plans to kill himself by blowing himself up at a giant concert for young girls by feigning the need for a wheelchair and utilizing explosives hidden inside the wheelchair. Jerome, Hodges, and Holly manage to uncover Hartsfield's real identity and search his computer hard drives. They eventually deduce that Hartsfield's target is at the concert, and the trio rush to the concert venue to stop him. Hodges begins to suffer a heart attack and is unable to venture into the concert with Holly and Jerome, but urges them to press on. Holly locates Hartsfield and delivers several harsh blows to his head using Hodges's "Happy Slapper" – a sock filled with ball bearings. Hartsfield is left bleeding and comatose on the concert floor.

Hodges (who had been saved by concert staff), Holly, and Jerome have a picnic to discuss the recently transpired events. Hodges has learned that he will not be criminally charged for his actions regarding the Hartsfield investigation. Holly and Jerome have received medals from the city, congratulating them on their work. Meanwhile, Hartsfield awakens from his coma and asks to see his mother.

Main characters 
Kermit William "Bill" Hodges – The main protagonist and a retired detective. Later in the story, he falls in love with Janey, Olivia's sister.
Brady Hartsfield – The main antagonist and Mr. Mercedes.
Jerome Robinson – Hodges' hired help and  close friend. He's a bright, computer-savvy adolescent.
Olivia Trelawney – The rich woman to whom the Mercedes Benz belonged. She dies by suicide, thinking that the voices she hears (which are actually coming from her computer) are the ghosts of the people the Mercedes killed.
Janelle "Janey" Patterson – Olivia Trelawney's sister. She encourages Hodges to investigate Mr. Mercedes, and later falls in love with Hodges. She is killed in a car bombing that was actually meant for Hodges.
Holly Gibney – Janey's cousin and later on, Hodges' partner in investigation.
Peter "Pete" Huntley – Hodges' former partner.
Deborah Ann Hartsfield – Brady's alcoholic mother. She later eats a poisoned hamburger that was meant for Jerome's dog, and dies a gruesome death.
Elizabeth Wharton – Olivia and Janey's elderly mother.

Reception
Mr. Mercedes received positive reviews, with many critics responding well to the book being different from King's "standard horror stories" and being a "compelling crime novel." It received a 4.07/5 score on Goodreads, dropping to 3.87 as of 19 January with 43,562 ratings  and a 4/5 on Barnes & Noble.

Michael Marshall Smith of The Guardian noted the novel "is firmly positioned in suspense-thriller territory and the non-supernatural world – somewhere King evidently feels increasingly at home. … At its heart, Mr Mercedes is a traditional cat-and-mouse story about a psychopathic killer and the renegade cop who makes it his mission to bring him down." Considering three levels of evaluation – quality per se, expectations of King's "readers who return for his distinctively unstoppable storytelling engine, his particular and hugely dependable voice", and rules of "whichever genre" King increasingly departs to, he sums up: "Good book? Hell, yes. Good Stephen King book? Absolutely." Brian Truitt of USA Today gave the novel 3 and 1/2 stars: "With an accidental gumshoe and a freaky serial killer, … Mr. Mercedes takes the old detective genre in an excellent, modern direction". He commended "a fascinating look at what makes a serial killer in a post-9/11 context", adding that King also "really succeeds with Hodges' companions". Sheryll Connelly of The New York Daily News stated the novel is "telling a story that could almost be characterized as sweet except of course for the sociopath on a bloody rampage. King will be King, and he’s never less than scary. Who in their right mind would want him to be?" and noted that this is one of his books where instead of it being "horrific, King expresses outright tenderness and it’s evident here."

Tasha Robinson of The A.V. Club was more reserved, writing that the novel opens with its best moment and "sags significantly in the middle, but it barrels toward a memorable conclusion … his tense, propulsive, ultra-fast-paced climax here seems like it was written with the movie in mind". Her main complaint was "a collection of laughably creaky old tropes at the center … a halfhearted stop at Señor Lazy’s Bargain Cliché Bin … predictable King-isms … a cutout character following a well-worn path". But she praised the novel for being "unusual in its dedication to surprising readers" and found it "a major step up from his previous book, Doctor Sleep".

Adaptation

In January 2015, it was announced that Mr. Mercedes would be turned into a limited television series. David E. Kelley was slated to write the project and Jack Bender would direct. Kelley and Stephen King serve as executive producers. On October 10, 2017, the Audience network announced that the series would be renewed for season 2, and conclude the story from the original Mr. Mercedes novel.  The third season was broadcast between September and November 2019.

See also
Stephen King bibliography

References

Novels by Stephen King
American detective novels
2014 American novels
Edgar Award-winning works
Charles Scribner's Sons books